Lars Åke Svensson (30 June 1926 – 25 June 1999) was a Swedish ice hockey goaltender. He competed at the 1952 and 1956 Winter Olympics and placed third and fourth, respectively.

In the early 1950s Svensson was the back-up goaltender for Thord Flodqvist. Between 1949 and 1956 he played 52 international matches and won European titles in 1951 and 1952, finishing second at the 1951 world and 1956 European championships, and third at Europeans in 1950 and 1955. Nationally, Svensson played with UoIF Matteuspojkarna in 1947–52, with AIK in 1952–55, and with Hammarby IF in 1955–56. He was awarded the Stora Grabbars Märke #43 in ice hockey, a Swedish sports honorary award created in 1928 by Bo Ekelund.

References

External links

1926 births
1999 deaths
Ice hockey players at the 1952 Winter Olympics
Ice hockey players at the 1956 Winter Olympics
Medalists at the 1952 Winter Olympics
Olympic bronze medalists for Sweden
Olympic ice hockey players of Sweden
Olympic medalists in ice hockey
Ice hockey people from Stockholm
Swedish ice hockey goaltenders